The Lenovo ThinkPad T410 is a laptop from the ThinkPad series manufactured by Lenovo. The Lenovo ThinkPad T410s was also released. A Product recall was ordered due to the fire hazard of the batteries.

References 

Lenovo laptops
ThinkPad